Saint-Frédéric Aerodrome  is located  north of Saint-Frédéric, Quebec, Canada. It is the home of the CEPQ (Quebec skydive club).

References

Registered aerodromes in Chaudière-Appalaches